Mount Dora is a city in Lake County, Florida, USA. As of the 2010 census it had a population of 12,370, and in 2019 the population was estimated to be 14,516. It is part of the Orlando-Kissimmee, Florida, metropolitan statistical area. Founded in 1880, Mount Dora is known for its small-town southern charm. It has many antique shops in the downtown area. The downtown area overlooks Lake Dora. Mount Dora is home to one of three freshwater lighthouses in Florida. It hosts many monthly festivals and is known as the "Festival City".

History

The town of Mount Dora began in 1874 when the area was settled by David Simpson, his wife, and two children. In 1880, Ross C. Tremain became the town's first postmaster, and later a major real-estate developer for the area. A post office called Mount Dora has been in operation since 1883. Tremain named the unincorporated village Royellou, after his children, Roy, Ella, and Louis.

The community was renamed for Dora Ann Drawdy, who was an early settler of the town in the mid-1880s. In 1846, the surveyors named Lake Dora after her, and in 1883, the town was renamed after the lake. The Mount in Mount Dora reflects the fact that the town is on a plateau 184 feet above sea level. In addition to this, Dora is memorialized through Dora Drawdy Way, an alleyway located in the downtown area.

The town became a popular winter retreat for hunters, fishermen, and boaters, and in 1883, the Alexander House, a two-story hotel, was opened. The Alexander House has been renamed several times and was listed on the National Register of Historic Places in 1975. A railroad came to town in 1887, followed by an orange-packing house, fertilizer factories, and a cannery. The town was granted a charter in 1910 with John Philip Donnelly as its first mayor; the town had 371 residents at the time.

In the 1920s, Mount Dora began to grow significantly, both in residential development and business development. Mount Dora began investing in public infrastructure, including streetlights, a water system, curbs, and paved roads. The first two public parks were created and the Mount Dora Community Building was built largely from funds raised by Mount Dora residents. The building has since served as the city's performance and meeting venue.

In 2013, the City of Mount Dora began to develop an area of land called the Wolf Branch Innovation District.  That plan was developed as the Wekiva Parkway started to expand and State Road 453 opened right into Mount Dora. The Wolf Branch Innovation District is currently being developed to become a high-technology and life-sciences business area. Expansion of infrastructure and roadways continues as Mount Dora prepares for future growth.

Historic sites
The following are listed on the National Register of Historic Places:
 Blandford
 John P. Donnelly House
 Lakeside Inn
 Old Mount Dora Atlantic Coast Line Railroad Station, home to the town's chamber of commerce
 Witherspoon Lodge of Free and Accepted Masons, No. 111

The Mount Dora Historic District is a U.S. historic district in downtown Mount Dora. The district is roughly bounded by 3rd Avenue, 11th Avenue, Clayton Street, and Helen Street. It was added to the National Register of Historic Places on October 1, 2009.

Geography
Mount Dora is located in eastern Lake County. It is bordered to the south by Orange County. U.S. Route 441 passes through the city, leading west  to Tavares, the Lake county seat, and northwest  to Orlando.

Museums 
Mount Dora is home to several different museums.

The Mount Dora History Museum is a project of the Mount Dora Historical Society. This museum is the location of the first fire station and city jail, which opened in 1923. The exhibits highlight activities in Mount Dora from the 1880s to the 1930s. The museum is located near Donnelly Park.

The Mount Dora Museum of Speed opened for business in 2001 to adults only and was located on North Highland Street. In 2015, it was named Mount Dora's number-one attraction by Tripadvisor for the third year in a row. The museum displayed muscle cars, "pro cars", foreign cars, and a more than 45-year-old collection of "automobilia" (auto antiques). The staff displayed 10 to 12 of their personal cars, and 12 to 15 cars were on sale at most times. The Mount Dora Museum of Speed closed in July 2019, and was to become a bike shop.

Modernism Museum Mount Dora opened in 2013 and is located on East Fourth Avenue. Two stories high, this museum focuses on the Studio Arts Movement, a form of modernism where high art meets craftsmanship, posing the question, "Is it sculpture, or is it furniture?"

The Mount Dora Center for the Arts is a multifaceted community center which provides fine arts gallery exhibitions, education programs for all ages and levels, an annual fine-art action, and monthly Art Strolls, and helps organize the Annual Mount Dora Arts Festival. Located on East Fifth Avenue, it was founded by a group of volunteers who wanted to celebrate the arts in Mount Dora and to promote and improve their arts festival.

Parks

Mount Dora is home to several parks and nature preserves.

Gilbert Park is located at the intersection of Tremain Street and Liberty Avenue. This park was named for its donor, Mr. Earl Gilbert. The park includes a barbecue area, several pavilions, and a large playground. The park has recently gone through renovations, which included two new pavilions, upgraded restrooms, new landscaping, and improved parking. The "Wood Wonderland" playground was updated and expanded.

Annie Donnelly Park is located in the downtown Mount Dora area at the intersection of Donnelly Street and 5th Avenue. It is the location of their annual tree-lighting ceremony, and several of Mount Dora's special events. The park contains benches, restrooms, a fountain, shuffleboard courts, a tennis court, and three pickleball courts. It is the location of the Donnelly Park building, which can be rented out for special events.

Grantham Point Park is located on Tremain Street across from Gilbert Park on Lake Dora; Grantham Point Park is sometimes referred to as "Lighthouse Park". The 35-foot lighthouse was dedicated on March 25, 1988. Built of bricks covered with stucco, the lighthouse stands sentry over the Port of Mount Dora. Its 750-watt photocell powers a blue pulsator, sending out a guiding light to all boaters navigating Lake Dora after dusk. The Mount Dora Light is the only inland freshwater lighthouse in Florida.

The Lake County Water Authority has several preserves in the area.

Demographics

As of the census of 2010, 12,370 people, 9,039 households, and 5,236 families resided in the city. The racial makeup of the city was 73.3% White, 19.2% African American, 0.1% Native American, 3.4% Asian, 0.1% Pacific Islander, 1.3% from other races, and 2.6% from two or more races. Hispanics or Latinos of any race were 7.7% of the population.

Of the 4,123 households,  21.1% had children under 18 living with them, 48.6% were married couples living together, 11.0% had a female householder with no husband present, and 37.2% were not families. About 31.6% of all households were made up of individuals, and 16.6% had someone living alone who was 65 or older. The average household size was 2.22, and the average family size was 2.75.

In the city, the age distribution was 20.5% under 18, 6.4% from 18 to 24, 21.7% from 25 to 44, 24.2% from 45 to 64, and 27.2% who were 65 or older. The median age was 46 years. For every 100 females, there were 86.0 males. For every 100 females 18 and over, there were 82.3 males.

The median income for a household in the city was $37,364, and for a family was $46,394. Males had a median income of $30,993 versus $24,259 for females. The per capita income for the city was $21,724. About 8.8% of families and 12.6% of the population were below the poverty line, including 21.6% of those under 18 and 9.1% of those 65 or over.

Education
The district is home to two elementary schools, one middle school, and Mount Dora High School. The district is also home to nine private schools.

Southern Technical College once operated a campus in the city; it has since closed.

Events
The city sponsors an annual Scottish Highland Festival, which will celebrate its 10th anniversary on Feb. 17 to 19, 2023. The event grows in popularity each year and features Scottish bands and musicians, Highland games, societies, historic re-enactors, and Mount Dora's own pipes and drums band, which performs in the area throughout the year.

The Mount Dora Center for the Arts hosts the Mount Dora Arts Festival, a juried fine-arts festival, on the first full weekend of February. The festival features works of fine art of several hundred national artists. The art for sale includes oil paintings, watercolors, acrylics, clay, sculpture, and photography. The festival also includes live musical entertainment and food.

The Mount Dora Spring Festival of Arts and Crafts is held every third weekend in March in the downtown area. The festival includes more than 250 fine and fun handcraft items and original art for sale on the streets of the historic downtown walking district. The festival lasts for two days.

The Sailboat Regatta and Mount Dora Earth Day are held in April. The regatta, which is hosted by the Mount Dora Yacht Club, is the oldest in the state and is celebrate its 70th year in 2023. Mount Dora Earth Day Celebration is a one-day event held on a Saturday around the annual international Earth Day. The event celebrates its 25th year in 2020 in Donnelly park.

The Mount Dora Blueberry Festival takes place on the last weekend in April, hosted by Visit Mount Dora, and is held in Donnelly Park. The free festival celebrates local blueberry farms as the industry takes over citrus in the farming community. It is a two-day event

The Mount Dora Seafood Festival takes place in September and began in 2015. The festival includes several booths with fresh seafood, beer, wine, crafts, and activities for children.

The Mount Dora Chamber of Commerce holds Florida's oldest bicycle festival annually in early October. It is three-day event. The festival includes a variety of daily rides, ranging from 8 to 100 miles.

Mount Dora's largest event, the Mount Dora Craft Fair, draws over 250,000 visitors every fourth weekend in October. It features more than 400 talented crafters and artists, and includes an eclectic mix of arts and crafts from sculptures to ceramics to paintings to woodworking. The Mount Dora Craft Fair was ranked the number-two Classic/Contemporary Craft Festival 2020 in America by Sunshine Artists magazine under the organization of festival coordinator, Janet Gamache.

The Mount Dora Plant and Garden Fair takes place on the second weekend in November in Donnelly Park. Growers of exotic and native plants from all over Florida gather to share and sell their plants to the public. It is a two-day event.

In fiction

Film 
The buildings in downtown Mount Dora were painted pink for the feature film Honky Tonk Freeway. Being a movie location provided an economic boost for merchants, helped restore the downtown area, and gave Mount Dora some national publicity.

Sister cities
  Forres, United Kingdom

References

External links
 

 
Cities in Lake County, Florida
Greater Orlando
Cities in Florida
1883 establishments in Florida
Populated places established in 1883